The Billy the Kid Trail, or Broken Trail, is a national scenic byway that runs from Lincoln County through Capitan, New Mexico. The trail was allegedly once used by William H. Bonney (aka Billy The Kid) and his group during the Lincoln County War. After a trail nicknamed "The Mexican Blackbird" was proven to be false, Bonney along with the Lincoln County Regulators Charlie Bowdre, Doc Scurlock, David "Biff" Richards, "Dirty" Steve Stevens, Richard "Dick" Brewer, Jose Chavez y Chavez, Douglas Bartolotta, "Arkansas" Dave Rudabaugh, Cory Windelspecht, Henry William French, and "Tommy" Tom O'Folliard rode this trail while fighting the Murphy / Dolan faction during the Lincoln County War in response to the death of John Tunstall.

This trail is the site of the ambush by Sheriff Pat Garrett and deputy forces on the group, which took the life of David "Biff" Richards in the fall of 1880.

References

External links

Billy the Kid